In Greek mythology, Tloos (Ancient Greek: Τλῶος) or Tlos (Τλῶς) was the eponym of Tlos, a Lycian city. He was the son of Tremilus who named after himself the land he settled, Tremile, which later became Lycia. Tlos' mother was the nymph Praxidice, daughter of Ogygus, and he was the brother to Xanthus, Pinarus and Cragus.

Note

Reference 

 Stephanus of Byzantium, Stephani Byzantii Ethnicorum quae supersunt, edited by August Meineike (1790-1870), published 1849. A few entries from this important ancient handbook of place names have been translated by Brady Kiesling. Online version at the Topos Text Project.

Lycians
Characters in Greek mythology
Lycia